Arroyomolinos, also known as Arroyomolinos de Montánchez, is a village in the province of Cáceres and autonomous community of Extremadura, Spain.

History
During the Peninsular War, Arroyomolinos was the site of the Battle of Arroyo dos Molinos which took place on 28 October 1811.

See also
Sierra de Montánchez

References

External links

 auto

Populated places in the Province of Cáceres